Mona Sax is a fictional character in the neo-noir media franchise Max Payne, where she represents the femme fatale archetype. Mona is a mysterious contract killer in a dangerous relationship with the series' titular protagonist, the policeman-turned-vigilante Max Payne. The character was portrayed by Kathy Tong and voiced by Julia Murney and Wendy Hoopes in the video games, and was played by Mila Kunis in the film adaptation.

Mona appears in the first two games in the series, Max Payne and Max Payne 2: The Fall of Max Payne. She is the second player character in Max Payne 2 after Max, and her tragic love story with Max is the center of the game's storyline. Mona also appears as a major character in the 2008 film Max Payne and makes a cameo appearance in the multiplayer mode of Max Payne 3. The games' version of the character was perceived highly positively by gaming community and mass media, but her portrayal in the movie received largely negative reviews.

Appearances

In video games
Mona Sax is a mysterious professional assassin, living in a derelict theme park on Coney Island that she set up as her base. She is introduced in the first Max Payne game as the "evil twin" of her younger sister Lisa, the abused wife of the Mafia boss Angelo Punchinello. Mona is captured by Punchinello's assassins before she could kill him, but manages to escape. It is revealed that she was employed by Nicole Horne, the renegade member of the secret society calling themselves the Inner Circle who has left the organization and manages Aesir Industries, a mysterious corporation that is behind the drug Valkyr. Horne ordered Mona to murder Punchinello since he wanted to act independent and out of her orders, a job Mona took because it was personal to her. By the end of the first game, Mona disappears in the Aesir headquarters elevator after being shot in the head by mercenaries for refusing an order to kill Max.

In Max Payne 2: The Fall of Max Payne, more focus is given to Max and Mona's relationship, and she becomes one of the game's two protagonists. Mona reappears as a suspect in the murder of the U.S. Senator Sebastian Gate. The case is assigned to Max Payne's new partner, detective Valerie Winterson, but despite their past, Max does not inform the authorities that he knows Mona nor does he inform them of her visit to his apartment. During the course of the game, it is revealed that Mona is indeed the killer of Senator Gates. To save her, Max is forced to shoot the corrupt Winterson before she can execute Mona. Mona and Max work together to prevent shadowy hitmen known as Cleaners from eliminating both of them. Eventually, it is revealed that Mona's employer was Alfred Woden, a U.S. senator and a member of the Inner Circle's faction warring with the faction of the Russian mob boss Vladimir Lem. In the end, she is shot in the back by Lem, whom Max kills.  She dies in Max's arms as he kisses her, but lives on the game's hardest difficulty level, "Dead on Arrival".

Mona does not appear in the gameplay of the first Max Payne game, but appears only in its cutscenes. She became playable in four chapters of the first sequel, Max Payne 2 ("Routing Her Synapses", "Out of the Window", "The Genius of the Hole" and "A Losing Game"). In it, Mona's moves are more acrobatic than Max's, and her sections involve several sniping sequences where Mona is using an exclusive Dragunov semi-automatic rifle, which provides a covering fire for Max. Her other weapon is a .50 caliber Desert Eagle, a handgun that she uses in the first game. Mona was also included as a playable multiplayer character in the Classic Multiplayer Character Pack of Max Payne 3 Special Edition.

Other appearances

Mona was portrayed by Mila Kunis in the movie version of Max Payne, whose role was described as "an assassin who teams up with the title character to avenge her sister's death." In the film, she is a Russian mobster and Max is the main suspect in the death of her sister Natasha (an original character similar to the game's Lisa and portrayed by Olga Kurylenko). Eventually, Max and Mona join forces to uncover the vast conspiracy behind the Valkyr drug. The film credits end with a scene of Max meeting Mona at a bar called Ragnarock.

She also appears in the flashback sequences in the Marvel digital comic book Max Payne 3: After the Fall. Her clothes for the Xbox Live Avatar were released by Rockstar Games on the Xbox LIVE Marketplace.

Portrayal
Mona's visual actress in Max Payne 2 was Kathy Tong, a Hollywood model.  According to the first two games' writer Sam Lake, he "did want to switch to Mona [...] but it was problematic. In the end, Max frames those sequences with his narration, saying that he doesn’t know exactly what happened, or what Mona did, but it must have been something like this. In other words, when you are playing Mona, you are actually experiencing Max’s guess of the events". Regarding Mona's possible survival at the end of Max Payne 2, Rockstar's Dan Houser stated that Max Payne 3 would "not continue that aspect of the story. We toyed with figuring out some way, or doing something clever, and then [decided] 'No, no, just move on from that bit of the story.' It really didn't work because there was no way of knowing the choices someone made."

As a self-described method actress, Kunis "took her job seriously" and "insisted on practicing a lot", but disliked Mona's outfit in the film, which was different from what the character wore in the games: "The clothes sucked. Oh my God, it was awful. Mark was like bundled up in jackets and wet suits and coats and turtlenecks and I was in a leather bustier and black pants and 5-inch heels."

Reception

Games
The video game version of Mona Sax was critically acclaimed for being one of the "relatively complex, non-stereotypical female game characters". She was included on the 2007 list of the 50 greatest female characters in video game history by Tom's Games, where she was described as "a stone-cold killer who's incredibly tempting but not entirely trustworthy" and "the perfect female accomplice to Max Payne." In 2008, PC Games Hardware listed her as one of the most important female characters in video games. In 2012, David Sanchez of GameZone proposed that Mona appear in her own spin-off game, calling her "one of the sexiest femme fatales in all of gaming", and added, "The fact of the matter is that Mona Sax is one hell of a character — one that hasn't starred in her very own game, but one that could very well do so and deliver an unforgettable experience." That same year, Austin Yorski of Blistered Thumbs listed Mona among his personal favorites while discussing the portrayals of video game female characters. In 2013, Complex ranked her as the 20th-best supporting character in video games.

Much of the positive reception came from the character's perceived sex appeal. In 2004, the staff of TeamXbox ranked Mona as number ten on their list of top "Xbox Babes", calling her "no princess waiting to be saved" and stating that she had replaced their "bad girl" type "childhood crush on G.I. Joe’s Baroness." Polish edition of GameStar included her in their 2006 poll "Miss of the Video Game World", in which she was voted at 17th place. The sex scene between Max and Mona, described as "actually one of the most fitting ever seen in a video game", was ranked as the fifth-top sexy moment in gaming by Games.net in 2007. MSN included her on their 2009 list of gaming's 12 "hottest babes" and wrote that "smart, sexy and dangerous" Mona was "remarkably presented in the game, being given the cold feel of a hired gun, with no regret or remorse". Mona was included on the list of nine "sexiest babes" of action games by The Times of India, who commented that she "fits in perfectly in the dark world of Max Payne." The affair between Max and Mona was ranked as the tenth-top video game romance by Joystick Divisions James Hawkins in 2011, and as the sixth-most disastrous game romance by GamesRadars Dave Meikleham that same year. They were also listed among the 25 best video game couples by IGNs Emma Boyes in 2012.

The character has received some negative reception. In 2003, Nick Catucci of The Village Voice called her "a woman carrying more emotional baggage than Witherspoon's Elle Woods has pink Gucci suitcases" and stated, "And Max's love interest? A contract killer who survived being shot in the head, and who you also play: Mona Sax. Who wrote this crap, Ed Wood?" Tyler Wilde of GamesRadar ranked a cheat to undress Mona nude for her gameplay sections in Max Payne 2 as the fourth-rudest cheat in video games.

Film
Critical reception of the film character has been generally negative. For instance, Richard Corliss of TIME wrote Mila Kunis was "not up to the task" and GameZones David Sanchez opined that "Mila Kunis ain't got nothin' on Kathy Tong". In 2011, Complex ranked Kunis as the tenth-most miscast action movie hero, because "her character, Mona Sax, is a heart-attack-serious Russian assassin, a description that brings to mind Amazon woman Brigitte Nielsen back in her Red Sonja days; Kunis, on the other hand, is petite and angelic-faced." Nevertheless, Kunis was nominated in the category "Choice Movie Actress: Action Adventure" at Teen Choice Awards 2009 for her portrayal of Mona in the film. Phil Hornshaw of GameFront ranked her as the "eighth-hottest game girl" in 2010 because the role, along with her enjoyment of World of Warcraft, earned her "some digital street cred".

References

External links
Mona Sax at Giant Bomb
Mona Sax at the Internet Movie Database

Action film characters
Action-adventure game characters
Fictional assassins in video games
Fictional criminals in video games
Female characters in video games
Fictional American people in video games
Fictional characters from Brooklyn
Fictional mass murderers
Fictional painkiller addicts
Fictional henchmen in video games
Max Payne
Fictional mercenaries in video games
Rockstar Games characters
Twin characters in video games
Video game characters introduced in 2001
Video game sidekicks
Woman soldier and warrior characters in video games